HMS Abyssinia was a breastwork monitor ordered, designed and built by J & W Dudgeon specifically for the Bombay Marine for the defence of the harbour at Bombay.

It was intended that Abyssinia and Magdala would serve in mutual support on the same station. Given that the stipulated naval requirement was for two ships for the coastal defence of the Bombay area, the India Office were pressed by the Board of Admiralty and the Chief Constructor to order two ships of the Cerberus class. After the placing of the order for Magdala, budgetary limitations meant that a smaller, cheaper vessel had to be acquired.

Abyssinia, while being similar in layout to Magdala, was smaller and cost £20,000 less. She had slightly less freeboard, a shorter breastwork, could carry less coal and had about one knot less speed.

The ferry trip out to her base in Bombay was made under her own power, without the use of any sail whatsoever. Unlike her half-sisters, the hull was not built up for the trip, which she made in a faster time than they did.

Service history
Abyssinia remained at anchor in Bombay harbour, other than for occasional brief trips for firing practice, for the whole of her service career. When the Indian Harbour Defence Service was discontinued in 1903, she was sold locally and broken up.

References

Further reading
 Oscar Parkes,  British Battleships  
 Conway,  All the World's Fighting Ships  
 Magdala & Abyssinia slideshow

External links

 

Monitors of the Royal Navy
Ships built in Cubitt Town
1870 ships